Juan Ernesto Soto Quintana (born 25 June 1956) is a Chilean former footballer who played as a midfielder.

International career
He played in 20 matches for the Chile national football team from 1977 to 1988. He was also part of Chile's squad for the 1983 Copa América tournament.

Honours

Club
Universidad de Chile
 Copa Polla Gol (1): 1979

Colo-Colo
 Primera División (1): 1989
 Copa Digeder (1): 1989

International
Chile
  (1):

References

External links
 
 Juan Soto at playmakerstats.com (English version of ceroacero.es)
 Juan Soto at PartidosdelaRoja 

1956 births
Living people
Footballers from Santiago
Chilean footballers
Chile international footballers
Chilean expatriate footballers
Universidad de Chile footballers
Everton de Viña del Mar footballers
Ñublense footballers
San Marcos de Arica footballers
Naval de Talcahuano footballers
Colo-Colo footballers
Atlético Morelia players
Chilean Primera División players
Primera B de Chile players
Liga MX players
Chilean expatriate sportspeople in Mexico
Expatriate footballers in Mexico
1983 Copa América players
Association football midfielders